Death by Design, is a 1943 British mystery film.

Death by Design may refer also  refer to:

 Batman: Death by Design, a graphic novel by Chip Kidd and Dave Taylor
 Death by Design, a crime novel by Barbara Nadel
 "Death by Design", an episode of Betrayed
 "Death by Design", an episode of Diagnosis Murder
 Death by Design: Capital Punishment As a Social Psychological System, a book by Craig Haney
 Death by Design: A Comedy with Murder, a play by Rob Urbinati
Death by Design: The Life and Times of Life and Times, a documentary about cell biology, also known as Death by Design: Where Parallel Worlds Meet

See also
 Death's Design, an album by Blakkheim
 Design for Death, a 1947 documentary